Glenn Holmes is a former state representative for the 63rd District of the Ohio House of Representatives. He is a Democrat.

Life and career
Holmes was born and raised in the Mahoning Valley.  He graduated from Girard High School before attending Mount Union College, where he received a bachelor's in sociology.  Holmes is a father of three and a grandfather of four.

In 2008, Holmes was elected the Mayor of McDonald, Ohio after serving as a councilmember there prior to that.  There, he focused on employee healthcare and responsible budgeting, and when he left office the town had a $2 million surplus.

Ohio House of Representatives
After serving as Mayor for over nine years, Holmes decided to run for an open seat in the Ohio House of Representatives in 2016.  The seat became open when three-term state Representative Sean O'Brien decided to run for the Ohio Senate, where Senator Capri Cafaro was term-limited.  A reliably Democratic seat, Holmes faced two other Democrats for the nomination, but won with a plurality of 44% of the vote.

Despite Donald Trump winning Trumbull County, the first time a Republican had done so in over eight decades, Holmes easily defeated Republican Devon A. Stanley by a 60% to 40% margin to take the seat.

References 

Living people
Democratic Party members of the Ohio House of Representatives
21st-century American politicians
People from Trumbull County, Ohio
Year of birth missing (living people)
University of Mount Union alumni